Kirants Monastery is an 8th-century Armenian monastery located about 10 kilometers southwest of Kirants village in the Tavush Province of Armenia. 

The story behind Kirants is extraordinary. This church, unlike most monasteries built in Armenia, is constructed mostly of brick and mortar. "Kir" is the word for mortar. "-ants" brings meaning that the previous word has "passed" the level, or is not level or uneven. The village had one very rich man who had one very beautiful daughter. A master craftsman and mason had fallen in love with the daughter and she with him. However, he came from a very poor family and he knew that he would have a difficult time convincing her father to allow him to have her hand in marriage. He tried nonetheless and the rich man said he would give his blessing if he the craftsmen well known for his talents would build him a church in the village. The craftsman agreed and built the beautiful church. He was on the top of the "drum or dome" and near completion of the church when the rich man came to see how things were coming along. The Craftsman asked the rich man "how does the church look?" the rich man responded by saying it looks great but "kiren antsa" or the line of the brick and mortar looks uneven. From this statement the craftsman, who was so excited that the church would be finished and he could marry his love, realized that the rich man had no intention to grant his daughters hand in marriage and jumps from the "drum or dome" taking his own life. 

This story is how "Kirantsi vank" or the "Kirants Monastery" got its name.

Gallery

External links 

 Armeniapedia.org: Kirants Monastery

Christian monasteries in Armenia
Buildings and structures in Tavush Province